Guide Seamount is a seamount in the eastern Pacific Ocean, about 16.6±0.5 million years old. It is similar in shape and orientation to the nearby Davidson, Pioneer, Rodriguez, and Gumdrop seamounts. It is named for the United States Coast and Geodetic Survey survey ship USC&GS Guide.

Guide Seamount is constructed of four nearly parallel volcanic ridges, separated by sediment-filled throughs. These are aligned parallel to magnetic anomalies in the underlying oceanic crust.

The lavas from Guide are mostly alkalic basalt, hawaiite, mugearite with some pyroclastic flows near the top of the summit.

References

External links
 Interactive bathymetry tool
 Appearance in original 1932 bathymetry

Seamounts of the Pacific Ocean